Minnesota State Highway 93 (MN 93) is a  highway in south-central Minnesota, which runs from its intersection with State Highway 112 (Main Street) at Le Sueur and continues north to its northern terminus at its intersection with State Highway 19 in Henderson. MN 93 connects the cities of Le Sueur and Henderson.

Route description
Highway 93 serves as a north–south route in south-central Minnesota between Le Sueur and Henderson.

The route crosses the Minnesota River at Le Sueur.  Highway 93 also parallels the Minnesota River.

Highway 93 runs concurrent briefly with U.S. Highway 169 near the city of Le Sueur.

The Dr. William W. Mayo House museum is located near the junction of Highways 93 and 112 in Le Sueur.  It is designated as a state historic site.

Highway 93 is also known as South 5th Street in Henderson.

The route is legally defined as Legislative Route 259 in the Minnesota Statutes. It is not marked with this number.

History
The present day Highway 93 was authorized in 1963.  Previously, this route was known as State Highway 259 from 1949 to 1963.

From 1933 to 1963, the route number "Minnesota 93" was used on a different state route between Redwood Falls and Sleepy Eye.  That route was replaced by extensions of present-day State Highways 67 and 68.

The present day Highway 93 between Le Sueur and Henderson was paved by 1953.

Major intersections

References

093
Transportation in Le Sueur County, Minnesota
Transportation in Sibley County, Minnesota